It is estimated that there are one million Romani people in the United States. Though the Romani population in the United States has largely assimilated into American society, the largest concentrations are in Southern California, the Pacific Northwest, Texas, Florida and the Northeast as well as in cities such as Chicago and St. Louis. 

The Romani or Roma are a nomadic ethnic group, commonly known by the pejorative term Gypsies, have been in the Americas since 1498. The largest wave of Romani immigrants came from Russia and the Balkans in the 19th century. Romani immigration to the United States has continued at a steady rate ever since, with an increase of Romani immigration occurring in the late 20th century following the Porajmos in Nazi Germany and its occupied European territories and then the collapse of communism in Central and Eastern Europe.

The size of the Romani American population and the absence of a historical and cultural presence, such as the Romani have in Europe, make Americans largely unaware of the existence of the Romani as a people. The term's lack of significance within the United States prevents many Romani from using the term around non-Romani: identifying themselves by nationality rather than heritage.

History

Origin
The Romani people originate from Northern India, presumably from the northwestern Indian states Rajasthan and Punjab.

The linguistic evidence has indisputably shown that roots of Romani language lie in India: the language has grammatical characteristics of Indian languages and shares with them a big part of the basic lexicon, for example, body parts or daily routines.

More exactly, Romani shares the basic lexicon with Hindi and Punjabi. It shares many phonetic features with Marwari, while its grammar is closest to Bengali.

Genetic findings in 2012 suggest the Romani originated in northwestern India and migrated as a group.
According to a genetic study in 2012, the ancestors of present scheduled tribes and scheduled caste populations of northern India, traditionally referred to collectively as the Ḍoma, are the likely ancestral populations of modern European Roma.

In February 2016, during the International Roma Conference, the Indian Minister of External Affairs stated that the people of the Roma community were children of India. The conference ended with a recommendation to the Government of India to recognize the Roma community spread across 30 countries as a part of the Indian diaspora.

Migration to the US

Romani slaves were first shipped to the Americas with Columbus in 1498. Spain sent Romani slaves to their Louisiana colony between 1762 and 1800. An Afro-Romani community exists in St. Martin Parish due to intermarriage of freed Africans and Romani slaves. The Romanichal, the first Romani group to arrive in North America in large numbers, moved to America from Britain around 1850. Iberian Gitanos and Balkan Romani, the ancestors of most of the Romani population in the United States today, began immigrating to the United States on a large scale over the latter half of the 19th century coinciding with the weakening grip of the Ottoman Empire and the Ottoman Wars in Europe in the 19th century, which ultimately culminated in the Russo-Turkish War (1877–1878), freeing many ethnic Eastern Europeans from Ottoman dominance and producing new waves of Romani immigrants. Other Roma mainly came from Greece and Italy. England and Scotland had shipped Romani slaves to Virginia.

That wave of Romani immigration comprised Romani-speaking peoples like the Kalderash, Machvaya, Lovari and Churari, and ethnically Romani groups that had integrated more within the Central and Eastern European societies, such as the Boyash (Ludari) of Romania and the Bashalde of Slovakia.

In 1999, the United States pledged to take up to 20,000 Kosovan refugees, many of them were Roma.

Settlements
Romani Americans are concentrated in large cities such Chicago and Los Angeles and states such as New York, Virginia, Illinois, New Mexico, Texas, Louisiana, Florida, and Massachusetts.

The Roma first came to Chicago during the large waves of Southern and Eastern European immigration to the United States in the 1880s until World War I. Two separate Romani subgroups settled in Chicago, the Machwaya and the Kalderash. The Machwaya came from Serbia and parts of the Austro-Hungarian Empire. They settled on the Southeast Side of Chicago.

There are about 20,000 Roma in Texas. In Texas, the two main Roma populations are Vlax and Romanichal. Romani Americans are concentrated in Houston and Fort Worth.

Groups
 Ludar: Hailing from North of the Balkans, Hungary, and the Banat, the Ludari, also known as Rudari, Boyash, or Banyash, are a subculture of Romani who arrived during the late 19th and early 20th centuries.
 Hungarian-Slovak Romani: The Romani of Northern Hungary largely settled in industrial cities of the Northern United States near the turn of the century. Among Romani from these areas were Olah, Romungre, and Bashalde immigrants. They were noted for their musical traditions and popularized Romani music in the United States by performing in cafes, night clubs and restaurants. Their prevalence in show business made Hungarian-Slovak Romani the most visible of the Romani groups arriving in America at the turn of the century and helped to shape the modern American idea of a Romani. The Bashalde reside principally in Pennsylvania, Ohio, Chicago and Las Vegas.
Romanichal: The ancestral home of the Romanichals is the British Isles. Members of this group are found across the U.S., with concentrations in Arkansas, Texas and the Southeast.
Black Dutch (genealogy): Sinte Romani from Germany, whom de Wendler-Funaro refers to as Chikkeners (Pennsylvania German, from the German Zigeuner), sometimes refer to themselves as "Black Dutch." They are few in number and claim to have largely assimilated into Romnichel culture. They are represented in de Wendler-Funaro's photographs by a few portraits of one old man and briefly referred to in the manuscript "In Search of the Last Caravan."

See also
 Indian Americans

References

Further reading
 Gropper, Rena C., and Carol Miller. “Exploring New Worlds in American Romani Studies: Social and Cultural Attitudes among the American Macvaia.” Romani Studies 11, no. 2 (2001): 81–110.
 Heimlich, Evan. "Romani Americans." in Gale Encyclopedia of Multicultural America, edited by Thomas Riggs, (3rd ed., vol. 4, Gale, 2014), pp. 1–13. Online
 Marafioti, Oksana. American Gypsy (Farrar, Straus and Giroux, 2012).

 Sutherland, Anne. “The American Rom: A Case of Economic Adaptation.”  in Gypsies, Tinkers and Other Travellers, edited by Farnham Rehfisch, (Harcourt Brace Jovanovich, 1975). pp 1–40.
 Sutherland, Anne. Gypsies: The Hidden Americans (Tavistock Publications, 1975).
 Sway, Marlene. Familiar Strangers: Gypsy Life in America (University of Illinois Press, 1988).

External links
  Gypsy Lore Society
 "Gypsy Americans", everyculture.com
 Macedonian Roma: Hidden in Plain Sight in the Bronx, New York 
 "Roma (Gypsies)", Texas State Historical Association

Roma
United States